Nurmijärvi is the most populated rural municipality of Finland, located  north of the capital Helsinki. The neighboring municipalities of Nurmijärvi are Espoo, Vantaa, Tuusula, Hyvinkää and Vihti, and it is part of the Greater Helsinki. The population of the municipality is  inhabitants. In recent decades, it has been one of the fastest growing municipalities in the Greater Helsinki and also in whole Finland in terms of population. The close proximity to Helsinki has led to a considerable growth of the major villages such as Klaukkala, Rajamäki and Röykkä. Klaukkala is the biggest built-up area of Nurmijärvi, which nowadays is considered a dormitory town of Helsinki. The Nurmijärvi church village (Kirkonkylä) is the administrative centre of the municipality, although the clear emphasis on population growth is in Klaukkala.

Nurmijärvi literally means "lawn lake" although the lake that gave the municipality its name was drained in the early 20th century and is now nothing more than some flat fields near the village centre. Nurmijärvi is one of three municipalities in the Uusimaa region that do not have a Swedish name; the others are Askola and Mäntsälä.

Matti Vanhanen, former Prime Minister of Finland and current Speaker of the Parliament, lives in Lepsämä in Nurmijärvi.

History 

The area of what is now Nurmijärvi was inhabited in prehistoric times, which refers to archaeological finds dating back to 4500–3500 BC. At the time of the Middle Ages there was no permanent settlement in the area, but later the settlement spread from both Tavastia and the coast to 15 villages in 1540 with 115 houses.

Administratively, Lake Nurmijärvi has been formed by combining the districts of Loppi, Vihti and Helsinki parish. The earliest documentary mention of Nurmijärvi dates back to 1488, when the village of Uotila was mentioned. According to the land register of 1539, Nurmijärvi had 15 villages with a total of 113 houses. An independent congregation had already been formed in 1605 and the administrator of Nurmijärvi was born in 1775, when the area had a population of 1471.

The first church in Lake Nurmijärvi, which must have been St. Martin's Church in 1565, was built at the end of the Middle Ages. It was demolished on the way to a new church, completed in 1692, and the present church, completed in 1793 and designed by master builder Matti Åkerblom, is the third in order.

Lake Nurmijärvi has long been a strong farmer, and the share of fields in the total municipal area is almost one third, which is more than in many other municipalities in Finland. Horticultural crops have also been heavily cultivated and, for example, almost half of the wild cabbage harvest in Finland is produced in Nurmijärvi. Nevertheless, the municipality has not carried out further processing of agricultural products; for example, there has been no dairy.

The first industrial plants were born in the late 19th century, including Finland's first pharmaceutical factory founded by pharmacist Albin Koponen in Nurmijärvi in 1899. The main products of the drug plant were filizine extracted from male fern root rhizomes, which were sold as Diphyllobothrium latum and cestoda medicines called Filisin and Filicon. The factory-produced filicin was sold encapsulated all the way to China and America. Today, trade, transport and other services account for two thirds, industry and construction for less than one third and agriculture for over 3% of the population. The largest individual employers are Altia Oyj and Teknos Oy in Rajamäki, Polimoon Oy in Klaukkala and Korsisaari Oy.

In the early 1960s, the settlement of Nurmijärvi was evenly distributed in different parts of the municipality. However, migration to Nurmijärvi began to accelerate around the middle of the decade and the focus of settlement shifted to the southern parts of the municipality. Already in 1970 the majority (65%) of the inhabitants of Nurmijärvi lived in urban settlements. The largest agglomerations at that time were Klaukkala (3,500 inhabitants), Rajamäki (3,400 inhabitants) and church village (2,800 inhabitants). Of these, the growth of Klaukkala and church village, in particular, has been based almost exclusively on the vicinity of the Helsinki metropolitan area. The most prominent farms on Lake Nurmijärvi have been the manors of Numlahti and Raala. Before the departure of Hyvinkää in 1917, the Kytäjä Manor as well as the whole of the Kytäjä village, were part of the Nurmijärvi parish.

Geography 

Nurmijärvi is located in the central part of Uusimaa. Salpausselkä passes through the northern part of the municipality via Röykkä, Kiljava and Rajamäki, and the River Vantaa flows through the Nukari and Palojoki rivers in the eastern part of the municipality. Nurmijärvi's lowest terrain is in the Luhtajoki valley at Klaukkala and the highest in Salpausselkä near Herunen.

There are few watercourses in the Nurmijärvi area. The municipality is located along the middle course of the River Vantaa and there are two large rapids, the Nukarinkoski and the Myllykoski. The Kuhakoski rapids, located in the village of Perttula and flowing into Lake Valkjärvi, is also significant in terms of industrial history and at the same time a popular attraction with its waterfall. The River Vantaa is joined by the Palojoki River from Hyvinkää and Tuusula, near the Palojoki village. The Lepsämä River and the Luhtajoki River flowing in the southern part of the municipality join the Vantaa town side near the Keimola village before joining the River Vantaa. The largest lake in Nurmijärvi is the Lake Sääksi (which is partly situated on the northwest side of Hyvinkää), which is known for one of the most popular beaches in Finland, being located in the Kiljava village. The other lakes are Lake Vaaksi near Röykkä and Lake Valkjärvi between Klaukkala and Perttula.

Villages 

Herunen, Järventausta, Kiljava, Klaukkala, Leppälampi, Lepsämä, Luhtajoki, Metsäkylä, Nukari, Numlahti, Nummenpää, Nurmijärvi (Kirkonkylä), Palojoki, Perttula, Raala, Rajamäki, Röykkä, Suomies, Uotila, Valkjärvi

Urban areas 

Table of the all statistical urban areas of the municipality. The administrative centre is in bold.

Transport 
The most important traffic route through Nurmijärvi is Finnish national road 3 (Vt 3; E12) between cities of Helsinki and Tampere. The highway was built as a motorway in the 1990s, and the old highway next to it between Helsinki and Hämeenlinna was numbered as Regional Road 130. Highway 3 is joined by Finnish national road 45 (Kt 45) on the Hyvinkää side from Hyrylä in Tuusula and through the eastern part of Nurmijärvi, and Finnish national road 25 (Vt 25) between Hanko and Porvoo passes through the northern part of the municipality near the Röykkä village. Other important roads are the Regional road 132 to Loppi and Karkkila via Klaukkala, Perttula and Röykkä and the connecting road 1311 to Rajamäki via the Nurmijärvi church village. The Hanko–Hyvinkää railway, which currently has only freight train traffic, also passes through Rajamäki and Röykkä. In Nurmijärvi, especially from Klaukkala, there are frequent bus services via Kivistö and Keimola of Vantaa to the Central Bus Terminal of Kamppi Center in Helsinki.

With the growth of Klaukkala, traffic congestion between Regional road 132 and Highway 3 has worsened so much over the years that the construction of a bypass road on the northside of Klaukkala as a new continuation of the regional road began in 2019. Although it was tentatively scheduled to be completed only in fall 2021, it is likely to be completed in summer and for traffic road may open as early as the end of 2020.

Government 

The municipality of Nurmijärvi belongs to the Uusimaa constituency. Nurmijärvi Municipal Council has 51 members; the chairman of the municipal board is Virpi Räty and the municipal council is Kallepekka Toivonen. The current municipal manager of Nurmijärvi is Outi Mäkelä; the previous manager, Kimmo Behm, retired on 1 May 2018.

Politics 
Results of the 2019 Finnish parliamentary election in Nurmijärvi:

Finns Party   20.1%
National Coalition Party   19.4%
Social Democratic Party   15.3%
Centre Party   14.6%
Green League   11.3%
Movement Now   5.9%
Left Alliance   4%
Blue Reform   3.2%
Christian Democrats   2.7%
Other parties   3.5%

Services

Health 

There are three health centers in Nurmijärvi that are part of the service production of the Central Uusimaa Joint Municipal Authority for Social and Health Service (Keski-Uudenmaan sotekuntayhtymä or Keusote): in the church village, Klaukkala and Rajamäki. In addition, there is also a hospital in the Kiljava village, which currently operates as a rehabilitation hospital.

Education 
In terms of basic education, Nurmijärvi has 17 primary schools (one for Swedish-speaking people), two comprehensive schools and one special education school. In terms of secondary education, Nurmijärvi has three secondary schools: Nurmijärvi Joint School (Nurmijärven yhteiskoulu) in the church village, Rajamäki High School (Rajamäen lukio) in Rajamäki and Arkadia Joint Lyceum (Arkadian yhteislyseo) in Klaukkala. The latter high school is private, the others are run by the municipality of Nurmijärvi. In addition, there is one of the campuses of Keuda, a consortium of vocational schools that provides vocational training, along the Lopentie in the village of Perttula.

Others 
Near the municipal center along the Tampere Highway, there is Myllykukko, known as a place for refueling and eating, and its services include Hesburger and Subway restaurants, among others. The only hotel in the municipality for tourists, Hotel Kiljava, is located in the village of Kiljava.

In 2021, the Bowling Corner & Billiard leisure venue was opened in the Nurmijärvi center, where people can go bowling and play billiards.

Culture 
Nurmijärvi is best known as the birthplace of Finland's national author, Aleksis Kivi. The coat of arms of municipality refers to his most famous literal work, Seitsemän veljestä (literally translated "the seven brothers") from 1870. Every year, the municipality hosts the Kivi Festival (Kivi-juhlat), the main venue of which is the Taaborinvuori museum area next to Aleksis Kivi's birthplace. On January 29, 2020, Nurmijärvi declared itself officially the Capital of Aleksis Kivi.

In the town center of Nurmijärvi is the small cinema Kino Juha, which has been in use since 1958 and is the size of only one hall.

The title bird of Nurmijärvi is the black woodpecker (Dryocopus Martinus), the title animal is the European badger (Meles meles) and the title plant is the male fern (Dryopteris filix-mas).

Food 
In the 1980s, the cultural dishes of Nurmijärvi parish were called pastries with raisin soup, a roast beef cured slowly in mild heat, berry cream and sweetened potato casserole.

Notable people 

 Bernhard Crusell (1775–1838), a composer
 Ellen Jokikunnas (born 1976), a model and PR manager
 Antti J. Jokinen (born 1968), a music video and film director
 Antti Kalliomäki (born 1947), a politician and athlete
 Dome Karukoski (born 1976), a film director
 Jesse Krohn (born 1990), a racing driver
 Aleksis Kivi (1834–1872), an author and playwright
 Jussi Niinistö (born 1970), a politician and a former Minister of Defence
 Viivi Pumpanen (born 1988), Miss Finland 2010
 Teemu Rautiainen (born 1992), a professional ice hockey player
 Aki Sirkesalo (1962–2004), a singer and broadcaster
 Timo Tolkki (born 1966), a guitarist, singer and songwriter
 Matti Vanhanen (born 1955), a politician, former Prime Minister of Finland and current Speaker of the Parliament
 Tatu Vanhanen (1929–2015), a political scientist and sociologist; the father of Matti Vanhanen
 Taavi Vartia (born 1965), a film director and script writer
 Waldo (born 1967), Eurodance musician

Friendship cities 
 Lilla Edet, Sweden
 Rapla, Estonia

References

External links 

Municipality of Nurmijärvi – Official site

 
Greater Helsinki
Populated places established in 1605
1605 establishments in Sweden